Zakhar Denysov (born 1 March 1990) is a Ukrainian handball player for HC Motor Zaporozhye and the Ukrainian national team.

He represented Ukraine at the 2020 European Men's Handball Championship.

References

1990 births
Living people
Ukrainian male handball players
People from Chornomorsk
HC Motor Zaporizhia players
Sportspeople from Odesa Oblast
21st-century Ukrainian people